Rudnik may refer to:

Places

Bosnia and Herzegovina 
 Rudnik (Ilidža – Sarajevo), a village in Bosnia and Herzegovina

Bulgaria 
 Rudnik, Burgas Province, a village in Bulgaria
 Rudnik, Varna Province, a village in Bulgaria

Kosovo 
 Rudnik, Kosovo, a village in Obilić

Macedonia 
 Rudnik, Veles, a village in Veles Municipality

Poland 
 Rudnik, Greater Poland Voivodeship (west Poland)
 Rudnik, Gmina Dobczyce, in Lesser Poland Voivodeship (south Poland)
 Rudnik, Gmina Sułkowice, in Lesser Poland Voivodeship (south Poland)
 Rudnik, Łódź Voivodeship (central Poland)
 Rudnik, Gmina Rudnik, in Lublin Voivodeship (east Poland)
 Rudnik, Lublin County, in Lublin Voivodeship (east Poland)
 Rudnik, Łosice County, in Masovian Voivodeship (central Poland)
 Rudnik, Mińsk County, in Masovian Voivodeship (central Poland)
 Rudnik, Otwock County, in Masovian Voivodeship (central Poland)
 Rudnik, Cieszyn County, in Silesian Voivodeship (south Poland)
 Rudnik, Racibórz County, in Silesian Voivodeship (south Poland)
 Rudnik, Starachowice County, in Świętokrzyskie Voivodeship (south-central Poland)
 Rudnik, Włoszczowa County, in Świętokrzyskie Voivodeship (south-central Poland)
 Rudnik, Kraśnik County, in Lublin Voivodeship (south-east Poland)
 Rudnik, Szczecin, a part of Szczecin, Poland
 Rudnik, now part of Kąkolewnica, in Radzyń Podlaski County, Lublin Voivodeship
 Rudnik nad Sanem, a town in Subcarpathian Voivodeship, Poland
 Rudnik Szlachecki, a village in Lublin Voivodeship, Poland

Serbia
 Rudnik (mountain), a mountain in central Serbia
 Rudnik (Gornji Milanovac), a small town in the municipality of Gornji Milanovac, Serbia
 Aleksinački Rudnik, a town in Serbia
 Senjski Rudnik, a village in Serbia

Slovenia 
 Rudnik District, a district of Ljubljana, Slovenia
 Rudnik, Ljubljana, a former village, now part of Ljubljana, Slovenia
 Rudnik pri Moravčah, a village near Moravče, Slovenia
 Rudnik pri Radomljah, a village near Kamnik, Slovenia

People
 Rudnik (surname)

See also 
 Gmina Rudnik (disambiguation)
 Rudnick (disambiguation)